The 2015–16 CERH European League is the 51st season of Europe's premier club roller hockey tournament organised by CERH, and the 19th season since it was renamed from European Champion Clubs' Cup to CERH Champions League/European League.

Barcelona were the defending champions, but they were eliminated in semi-finals by the eventual winners Benfica, who became European champions for a second time.

Teams
League positions of the previous season shown in parentheses (TH: Title holders, CW: Cup winners, LSF: Losing semi-finalists, LQF: Losing quarter-finalists). Bold means seeded teams.

Round dates
The schedule of the competition is as follows (draw held at CERH headquarters in Lisbon, Portugal, on 6 September 2015).

Group stage
The draw for the group stage was held on 6 September 2015, 11:00, in Luso, Portugal. The 16 teams were allocated into four pots, with the title holders Barcelona being automatically placed in pot 1. Liceo La Coruña, Benfica and Forte dei Marmi were the other three seeded teams. The remaining teams were then drawn into four groups of four, with the restriction that teams from the same association could not be drawn into the same group. In each group, teams play against each other in a home-and-away round-robin format, with the top two teams advancing to the knockout stage.

Group A

Group B

Group C

Group D

Knockout phase
The knockout phase comprises a quarter-final round and the final four tournament. In the quarter-finals, group stage winners play against group stage runners-up, the latter hosting the first of two legs. The winners qualify for the final four, which will take place at the ground of one of the four finalists.

Quarter-finals
The first-leg matches were played on 5 March, and the second-leg matches were played on 2 April 2016.

|}

Final four
The final four tournament took place on 14 and 15 May 2016. It was hosted by Benfica at the Pavilhão Fidelidade in Lisbon, Portugal.

All times listed below are local time (UTC+01:00).

Semi-finals

Final

See also
2015 CERH Continental Cup
2015 FIRS Intercontinental Cup

References

External links

Rink Hockey Euroleague
2015 in roller hockey
CERH European League